Tisis yasudai is a moth in the family Lecithoceridae. It was described by Kyu-Tek Park in 2003. It is found on Sabah, Malaysia's easternmost state,

The wingspan is about 17.5 mm for males and 17–19 mm for females. The forewings are dark brown at the base, with a golden-yellow, broad transverse streak running to one-fourth, the lower angle extended to near the inner margin, and the upper angle extending to the apex along the costa. The median band is golden yellow, almost straight vertically. The hindwings are grey with long dense hair-like scales along the upper margin of the cell and fold.

Etymology
The species is named for the Japanese lepidopterist T. Yasuda.

References

Moths described in 2003
Tisis